Lady and the Tramp II: Scamp's Adventure is a 2001 American animated direct-to-video musical romance film produced by Walt Disney Television Animation, and the sequel to the 1955 Disney animated film Lady and the Tramp. It was released on February 27, 2001, 46 years after its predecessor in 1955.

The film centers on Lady and Tramp's only son, mischievous teen-like Scamp, who longs for freedom from house rules and dreams of becoming a "wild dog". One day, Scamp runs away from home and joins the "Junkyard Dogs", led by street-smart Buster. He also meets Angel, a lovely stray, but later finds himself forced to choose between the excitement and adventure of running wild and  the love and devotion of his family back home, and struggles to decide which path to take.

Disney re-released the film in the United States on DVD after the Platinum Edition DVD release of the first film on June 20, 2006. The Special Edition DVD went back into the Disney Vault on January 31, 2007. The film was re-released on DVD, and for the first time on Blu-ray on August 21, 2012. The Blu-ray/DVD combo pack went back into the Disney Vault on April 30, 2013.

Plot 

In 1912, just two days before the Fourth of July, Lady and Tramp have three well-mannered daughters, Annette, Collette, and Danielle, and a rambunctious son named Scamp. After Scamp makes a mess in the house, Jim Dear chains Scamp to the doghouse outside in order to let him earn some disclipine. His parents, Tramp and Lady, are distraught that their son cannot settle down and follow house rules. Tramp tries to reason with Scamp, but he got very cross with his son's insistent desire to be a wild dog. Later, Scamp sees a pack of stray dogs, named the Junkyard Dogs, harassing the dogcatcher outside the yard and becomes intrigued. Scamp breaks free from his chain and runs off to find the pack. He finds a young member of the pack, Angel, and she takes him to the rest of the Junkyard Dogs. Meanwhile, Lady notices that Scamp has run away, and alerts Tramp.

Scamp attempts to join the Junkyard Dogs right away, but their leader, Buster, gives him a test in the alley, in which Scamp must successfully grab a tin can from a savage bullmastiff named Reggie. This results in Reggie chasing Scamp, but Reggie ends up getting caught by the dogcatcher. The Junkyard Dogs then head to a park, where Sparky, another member, tells a story about Tramp escaping from a group of dogcatchers. Buster, who was once good friends with Tramp, angrily explains that Tramp fell in love with Lady and became a house pet. Scamp is in awe that his father used to be a Junkyard Dog. After Scamp and Angel narrowly escape from a train and fall into a river, they start to fall in love.

Meanwhile, Scamp and Angel find Scamp's parents, along with Jim Dear, Darling, Jock, and Trusty, as they search for him. Angel, who was once a house pet herself, is disgusted that Scamp would choose living on the streets over a loving family. The next day, Buster gives Scamp his final test: to steal food from his family’s picnic. Scamp succeeds, but is caught by his father. Scamp confronts him and Buster convinces Scamp to stay a wild dog. To prove this, Buster bites Scamp's collar off and a disheartened Tramp leaves. Scamp celebrates his newfound freedom until Angel scolds him for leaving his family. Annoyed, Scamp inadvertently reveals that Angel wants to be a house dog. She runs off, and Scamp tries to find her, to no avail. Scamp is caught by the dogcatcher, with a shocked Angel looking on. She runs to find Tramp; the two set off to rescue Scamp. At the pound, Scamp is placed in the same kennel as Reggie. Tramp arrives and manages to fight him off to rescue his son, and the dogcatcher is defeated by Angel. While walking home, Scamp apologizes to his father for running away, and Tramp then apologizes back for losing his temper at him. After getting his collar back, Scamp gets Buster trapped under a pile of junk, which he will be abandoned as his punishment. Tramp then returns home with Scamp, and the family decides to adopt Angel. In the end, Buster's former gang members all find loving homes with new owners, leaving him in the junkyard all alone.

Cast 
Many of the original characters make a return, including Tony and Joe from Tony's.

 Scott Wolf as Scamp (or "Whirlwind" as Tramp calls him), Lady and Tramp's rambunctious teenage son who bears a strong resemblance to Tramp. Like his father, Scamp is a mixed-breed dog. He starts out as a playful, frisky, yet stubborn and selfish puppy, but has a total change of heart for his family after seeing that Buster betrayed him, as well as the fact that he suddenly realized he was not safe out there in the streets, and that his family loves him. Roger Bart provides his singing voice. Andrew Collins served as the supervising animator for him.
 Alyssa Milano as Angel, a Pomeranian/Siberian husky dog who was once a pet and Scamp's love interest. She has a kind, yet spunky personality. At the end of the film, she is adopted by Jim Dear and Darling. She too bares a nickname for Scamp due to his inexperience with the streets, calling him "tenderfoot", which is another reason why she has a crush on him. Susan Egan provide her singing voice for select songs. Andrew Collins served as the supervising animator for her.
 Chazz Palminteri as Buster, a Rottweiler/Doberman Pinscher mix and the smug, sadistic and villainous leader of the Junkyard Dogs. He used to be the protégé of Tramp and is angry that Tramp left to become a house pet with Lady. He thus changes his motto after Tramp left to "Buster's trouble, is Buster's trouble." Jess Harnell provides his singing voice. Kevin Peaty served as the supervising animator for him.
 Jeff Bennett as Tramp, a mongrel (with a mixture of a schnauzer and a terrier) and the father of Scamp, Annette, Collette, and Danielle. Tramp has become accustomed to living in a home during his time as a pet. He is portrayed as a loving, but firm and concerned father, and has an important role in this film. Nevertheless, he still has a few "street smarts" to fall back on, due to his near-old age. Bennett also voices Trusty and Jock, a bloodhound and a Scottish Terrier who are the neighbors and friends of Lady and Tramp. They join Scamp's family in a search to find him. Bennett also voices the Dogcatcher, who, in a style reminiscent of Don Knotts's portrayal of Barney Fife on The Andy Griffith Show, chases after the Junkyard Dogs, determined to capture them.
 Jodi Benson as Lady (or "Pidge", which Tramp always calls her because of her naivety in the first film), an American Cocker Spaniel who is the mother of Scamp, Annette, Collette, and Danielle, and Tramp's mate. Due to her now being a mother of four, most of her naivety from the first film has been replaced with a sense of responsibility. She views Scamp's behavior in a more understanding light than Tramp does. Lianne Hughes served as the supervising animator for her.
 Bill Fagerbakke as Mooch, an Old English Sheepdog who is fairly dim-witted but enthusiastic. He is seen playing with children at the end of the film. Kevin Peaty served as the supervising animator for him.
 Mickey Rooney as Sparky, an Irish Wolfhound who used to know Tramp. He tells an inaccurate story about Tramp escaping from a group of dogcatchers, which ends with Tramp jumping down a ravine, never to be seen again. Kevin Peaty served as the supervising animator for him.
 Cathy Moriarty as Ruby, an Afghan Hound who has a soft spot for puppies. Kevin Peaty served as the supervising animator for her.
 Bronson Pinchot as Francois, a Boston Terrier with a French accent. Kevin Peaty served as the supervising animator for him.
 Debi Derryberry and Kath Soucie as Annette, Collette, and Danielle, three well-behaved and polite Cocker Spaniel puppies who are Scamp's sisters. They greatly resemble their mother Lady but each have different colored collars on their necks. They are prissy, love taking baths, and show no respect for Scamp, until the middle of the film when they actually start to miss him. Annette is blue collared and bossy, Danielle is white collared and rowdy, and Collette is red collared with long ears and a snobbish personality. While they are at odds with Scamp at times, they do love him, due to the fact that he is their brother. Their names are not mentioned in the film, but in the end credits.
 Rob Paulsen as Otis, a Chinese Crested in the dog pound. His name is not mentioned in the film, but in the end credits.
 Nick Jameson and Barbara Goodson as Jim Dear and Darling, the owners of Lady, Tramp, Scamp, Annette, Collette, Danielle, and by the end of this film, Angel.
 Andrew McDonough as Junior, Jim Dear and Darling's son and the youngest owner of Lady, Tramp, Scamp, Annette, Collette, Danielle, and by the end of this film, Angel.
 Tress MacNeille as Aunt Sarah, Jim’s aunt, Junior's great aunt, and the owner of Si and Am. She shows no respect for Scamp, believing him to be a "monster".
 Mary Kay Bergman and Tress MacNeille as Si and Am, Aunt Sarah's two sneaky Siamese cats. They have a much more minor appearance in this film than in the original. However, they are shown to have an unpleasant relationship with Scamp, just like in the comics with Scamp as protagonist.
 Jim Cummings as Tony, the owner and chef of Tony's.
 Michael Gough as Joe, Tony's assistant. Both he and Tony have only minor appearances in this film.
 Frank Welker as Reggie, an extremely vicious and very large bullmastiff/bulldog mix. He chases Scamp in a street, but gets caught by the dogcatcher, who unexpectedly sends him flying to a tomato stand. Later, he is chained when he attempts to kill Scamp, who is in the pound, but is fought off by Tramp. Reggie can be noticed because of his short tail and chipped canine.
 April Winchell as Mrs. Mahoney, a woman on the streets who wears a wig and carries around a poodle in a purse. On two occasions involving dog chases, she gets knocked over and her wigs get knocked off at the same time which publicly humiliates her. Of the two rounds in which this happens, she actually ends up completely losing the wig she had on in the first dog chase. Like Annette, Danielle, Collette, and Otis, her name is not mentioned in the film, but in the end credits.
 Scratchy, a Scottish Deerhound who is plagued by fleas and fur loss. Scratchy is a member of the Junkyard Dogs until the end of the film, when all of the dogs decide to leave the junkyard to find their own homes and families. However, Scratchy does not have a speaking role in this film at all.

Reception

Critical reception 
The review aggregator website Rotten Tomatoes reported that the film received  approval rating with an average rating of  based on  reviews.

Accolades 
The film received seven nominations and won one award. It received nominations from the International Animated Film Association (ASIFA) during the 29th Annie Awards in 2001, from DVD Exclusive during the 2001 DVD Exclusive Awards, and the Academy of Science Fiction, Fantasy & Horror Films during the 28th Saturn Awards in 2002. It won the Video Premiere Award in the 2001 DVD Exclusive Awards for Best Animated Character Performance for Scott Wolf as the speaking voice of Scamp).

Soundtrack 

The soundtrack of the film was released through Walt Disney Records. The score for it was mainly composed by Melissa Manchester and Norman Gimbel. But it was never released in stores for unknown reasons. The song Bella Notte from the original film is heard in the end credits sung by Joy Enriquez and Carlos Ponce.

Track listing

References

External links 

 
 
 
 
 

2001 animated films
2001 direct-to-video films
2001 directorial debut films
2001 films
2000s American animated films
2000s children's animated films
2001 romantic comedy-drama films
2000s musical comedy films
American children's animated adventure films
American children's animated musical films
American coming-of-age films
American musical comedy films
American romantic comedy-drama films
American romantic musical films
American sequel films
Animated coming-of-age films
Animated films about dogs
Animated films about friendship
Children's comedy-drama films
Direct-to-video sequel films
Disney direct-to-video animated films
Disney Television Animation films
Films about families
Films directed by Darrell Rooney
Films set in 1911
Films set in the United States
Walt Disney Pictures films
Independence Day (United States) films
2000s English-language films
Lady and the Tramp